K-30 is a  state highway running from Interstate 70 (I-70) north to the southern city limit of Maple Hill. A previous designation existed in the late 1920s which was removed by 1932. It existed in Jefferson County. The current route was established in the early 1930s.

Route description 

The route begins at a partial cloverleaf interchange with I-70, which also carries US 40, at that freeway's exit 341. The road continues southward as Windy Hill Road toward Eskridge. From I-70, K-30 crosses the Mill Creek before intersecting Waterman Crossing Road. The road then crosses a railroad owned by Union Pacific before abruptly turning to the east. K-30 warps slightly northeast, running parallel to the railway line. Following an intersection with Sunset Lane, the highway picks up the name of Elm Street as it runs along the southern city limit of Maple Hill. The roadway ends near an intersection with Main Street.

The route is maintained by the Kansas Department of Transportation (KDOT). In 2010, KDOT calculated that the route's annual average daily traffic was 1420 vehicles, including 85 trucks. No segment of the highway is part of the National Highway System. The National Highway System is a system of highways important to the nation's defense, economy, and mobility.

History 
A previous designation for K-30 was brought into the Kansas state highway system by 1927. The route connected US 40 in Tonganoxie to US 73W in Oskaloosa. At that time, it was only a graded road. This designation was removed by 1932. The current designation of K-30 was established in the early 1930s, from K-10 (at that time) to Maple Hill, when it was only a gravel road. In 1953, the route was paved. In 1960, I-70 was completed through the region, replacing K-10. Since then, the route has not been realigned.

Major intersections

References

External links 

Kansas Highway 30 at Kansas Highways Routelog

030
Transportation in Wabaunsee County, Kansas